is a Japanese professional Go player.

Biography 
Yuki won the NHK Cup in 2010 for the second time in a row, becoming the third player after Eio Sakata and Norimoto Yoda to do such. He was selected as a representative of the Japanese team at the 16th Asian Games. In 2010, Yuki reached the final of the 22nd Asian TV Cup. He defeated Chen Yaoye in the first round and followed it by forcing Kang Dongyun into resignation. Yuki then lost to Kong Jie in the final by resignation. Yuki has represented Japan on the international stage and has beaten several players including Cho Hunhyun, Chang Hao, Gu Li, Lee Sedol and Ma Xiaochun. In November 2010, Yuki won his first major title, the Tengen. He swept title holder Keigo Yamashita in the finals. Yuki's title was the Kansai Ki-in's second major title in 29 years, coming a month after Hideyuki Sakai's Gosei title. Yuki participated in the RICOH Rengo Championship in 2011. He and his partner Ayumi Suzuki lost to O Meien and Xie Yimin. In April 2011, Yuki reached 1,000 career wins and broke the record for youngest to 1,000 wins by three years (Cho Chikun, 42).

Career record 
2006: 40–15
2007: 35–15
2008: 35–17
2009: 40–15
2010: 38–20
2011: 27–20

Titles and runners-up

References

Bibliography

 Reissue of Meikyoku Saikai supplement to monthly magazine "Igo" covering the 67th Honinbo League on 8 December 2011.

External links
GoGameWorld Player Info for Yuki Satoshi
Kansai Ki-in profile (in Japanese)

1972 births
Japanese Go players
Go (game) writers
Living people
Sportspeople from Hyōgo Prefecture
People from Kobe
Asian Games medalists in go
Go players at the 2010 Asian Games
Asian Games bronze medalists for Japan
Medalists at the 2010 Asian Games